The Pittsburgh Light Rail, commonly known as the T system, is the light rail system for Pittsburgh, Pennsylvania. It is run by Pittsburgh Regional Transit and currently consists of the Red Line, Blue Line and Silver Line. Trolley lines began on the T's route in 1897, and currently The T is the eighteenth most used light rail system in the United States. As of the fourth quarter of 2013 it had an annual ridership of 8,321,700, with 28,300 daily boardings over its 26.2 mile length. It has 53 stations over two lines and was last expanded in 2012 with the completion of the North Shore Connector.

Stations and stops

References
General
 T map. Port Authority of Allegheny County. Retrieved May 15, 2012.

Specific

External links

 Port Authority of Allegheny County official site

Port Authority of Allegheny County
 
Pittsburgh "T"
Pittsburgh Light Rail